Megachile moera is a species of bee in the family Megachilidae. It was described by Cameron in 1902.

References

Moera
Insects described in 1902